This is a list of Canadian films which were released in 1978:

See also
 1978 in Canada
 1978 in Canadian television

References

1978
1978 in Canadian cinema
Canada